John Newton Opie (March 13, 1844 – January 26, 1906) was an American politician who served as a member of the Virginia Senate. His autobiography "A Rebel Cavalryman", detailed his service during the Civil War as an enlisted soldier and later Captain.

A believer in Women's suffrage, John N. Opie advocated for the right before Virginia's senate in 1904, for which he was called "...rather radical in his beliefs." Women's suffrage in Virginia was later achieved in 1920, fourteen years after his death.

References

External links
 
 

1844 births
1906 deaths
Democratic Party Virginia state senators
19th-century American politicians
20th-century American politicians
People from Jefferson County, West Virginia